Dimethylsilane is a compound with the formula C2H8Si. It is flammable.  It is used in chemical vapor deposition.

See also
 Trimethylsilane

References

Carbosilanes